Manuel Antonio Suárez Jiménez (born 28 February 1972) is a Chilean football manager and former player who played as a goalkeeper.

Playing career
Born in Santiago, Suárez started his career with Unión Española in 1990. He also played for Audax Italiano and Unión San Felipe in his home country, aside from a short spell at Swiss side FC St. Gallen before retiring in 1997. In an international level, he played for the Chile under-23 national team in 1994.

Managerial career
After retiring, Suárez started working as a goalkeeping coach until joining Universidad Católica in 2003. In 2010, after Juan Antonio Pizzi was named manager of the club's first team, Suárez was named as his assistant.

Suárez followed Pizzi to Rosario Central, San Lorenzo, Valencia, León and the Chile and Saudi Arabia national teams, always as his assistant. He left the latter in September 2018, and returned to his home country to work at Deportes La Serena as a sports consultant.

On 3 January 2022, Suárez was announced as manager of Categoría Primera A side Cortuluá for the 2022 season. On 2 May, he was sacked.

References

External links

1972 births
Living people
Footballers from Santiago
Chilean footballers
Unión Española footballers
FC St. Gallen players
Audax Italiano footballers
Unión San Felipe footballers
Chilean Primera División players
Swiss Super League players
Primera B de Chile players
Chilean expatriate footballers
Chilean expatriate sportspeople in Switzerland
Expatriate footballers in Switzerland
Association football goalkeepers
Chilean football managers
Club León non-playing staff
Categoría Primera A managers
Chilean expatriate football managers
Chilean expatriate sportspeople in Argentina
Chilean expatriate sportspeople in Spain
Chilean expatriate sportspeople in Mexico
Chilean expatriate sportspeople in Saudi Arabia
Chilean expatriate sportspeople in Colombia
Expatriate football managers in Colombia
Cortuluá managers